Joel Riethmuller (born 9 May 1985) is an Italy international rugby league footballer who previously played professionally for the North Queensland Cowboys in the National Rugby League.

Background
Riethmuller was born in Tully, Queensland, Australia.

Playing career
Riethmuller played his junior football for the Tully Tigers. Before playing for the Cowboys, he played for the Ipswich Jets and the Northern Pride in the Queensland Cup.

He made his NRL debut against the Manly-Warringah Sea Eagles in round 14 of the 2011 season, at the age of 26, having broken into the Cowboys' first-grade squad after performing well in the Queensland Cup. He signed a new two-year contract with the Cowboys shortly after his debut. At the end of the 2011 season he made his international debut for Italy in a 96–8 win over Russia in Padova. He qualified for the Italian team by virtue of having an Italian grandfather.

Riethmuller made 21 tackles in just 19 minutes on the field in his debut game. Riethmuller has represented the Queensland Residents on three occasions, scoring 2 tries. Riethmuller scored his first NRL try in his fourth NRL Game against the Newcastle Knights in their Round 18 win over them at Hunter Stadium.

In 2012 he was named in the Queensland Residents side.

In 2015, Riethmuller is playing for Cairns Brothers in the Cairns District Rugby League Competition.

Joel is an Australian Apprenticeships Ambassador for the Australian Government and an Apprentice Mentor in the NRL's Trade UP With The NRL Program.

References

External links
2017 RLWC profile

1985 births
Living people
Australian rugby league players
Australian people of Italian descent
Italy national rugby league team captains
Italy national rugby league team players
North Queensland Cowboys players
Northern Pride RLFC players
Ipswich Jets players
Rugby league locks
People from North Queensland
Rugby league players from Queensland